The term State papers is used in Britain and Ireland to refer to government archives and records. Such papers used to be kept separate from non-governmental papers, with state papers kept in the State Paper Office and general public records kept in the Public Record Office. When they were written, they were regarded as the personal papers of the government officials writing them, but in 1702, the State Papers Office was established and requisitioned them.

In Ireland, these records were held in a single repository, the Public Record Office. In 1922, this was in two locations, the Bermingham Tower of Dublin Castle and the Four Courts on Dublin's quays. However, the vast majority of records, particularly before 1790, were held in the Four Courts. When the Four Courts was occupied by the anti-Treaty forces of the Irish Republican Army in April 1922, the pro-Treaty forces came under pressure to remove them. Following the assassination of the British Field Marshal, Henry Hughes Wilson by anti-Treaty forces on 22 June, the pro-Treaty IRA came under pressure from Britain to attack the Four Courts or else British forces, still occupying Ireland, would take action. On 27 June, Michael Collins, the leader of the Pro-Treaty forces, gave the order to attack the garrison in what is widely regarded as the opening shot of the Irish Civil War. In the process, most of these records were destroyed. One historian, Pablo McNeill, who was in the Public Record Office section of the Four Courts at the time of the bombing is reported as diving for cover and bringing an important manuscript with him in the act that destroyed most other written records of Ireland's British rulers.

The Irish State Paper Office contains papers from the offices of:
 President of Ireland
 Taoiseach
 Oireachtas, i.e. Dáil Éireann and Seanad Éireann
 Departments of State

There are papers also from former offices of state, including:
 King of Ireland
 Monarch of the United Kingdom of Great Britain and Ireland relating to Ireland
 Lord Lieutenant of Ireland
 Chief Secretary for Ireland
 Under Secretary for Ireland
 Irish House of Commons & Irish House of Lords
 House of Commons of Southern Ireland
 Attorney-General for Ireland
 Governor-General of the Irish Free State

The Irish State Paper Office was formerly located in Dublin Castle, while the Irish Public Records Office was located at the Four Courts. In the late 1980s the distinction was abolished and both archives merged and moved to a new National Archives of Ireland in Bishop Street in Dublin.

The National Archives of the United Kingdom is located in Kew, near London. The Royal Archives are kept separately at Windsor Castle.

See also
 Thirty Year Rule

References

External links

Politics of the Republic of Ireland
Collection of The National Archives (United Kingdom)